San Juan, Puerto Rico, held an election for mayor on November 3, 1992. It was held as part of the 1992 Puerto Rican general election. It saw the reelection of incumbent mayor Héctor Luis Acevedo, a member of the Popular Democratic Party.

Nominees
Héctor Luis Acevedo (Popular Democratic Party), incumbent mayor
Carlos Díaz Olivo (New Progressive Party)
Hiram A. Meléndez Rivera (Puerto Rican Independence Party)

Results

References

1992
San Juan, Puerto Rico mayoral
San Juan, Puerto Rico